In mathematics, in the field of group theory, a subgroup of a group is termed central if it lies inside the center of the group.

The center is a characteristic subgroup.

Central subgroups have the following properties:

 They are abelian groups (because, in particular, all elements of the center must commute with each other).
 They are normal subgroups. They are central factors, and are hence transitively normal subgroups.

References 
 .

Subgroup properties